José de Jesús Vera (born 9 February 1969) is a retired Venezuelan professional footballer who played five seasons for Unión Atlético Maracaibo and was called–up by José Omar Pastoriza for play the 1999 Copa América celebrated in the country of Paraguay with his national team. He has that facts mentioned as one of his football career's most important moments.

Managerial career
In 2008, Vera became a manager, starting with Estudiantes de Mérida, club in where he debuted as footballer for then arrive to Deportivo Táchira after of achieve the Primera División honour with Zamora during the Torneo de Clausura 2011. However, after a bad spell at one of two powerhouse clubs of his country, in January 2012, was replaced by Colombian coach Jaime de la Pava and then returned to his natal city Mérida.
In 2017, Vera joined FC Dallas as Assistant Coach and Director of Scouting in August 2017, overseeing the club's identification and scouting of players around the world as well working with the first team on training and scouting of opposing teams.

Honours

Player honours
Unión Atlético Maracaibo
 Primera División (1): 2004–05

Managerial honours
Zamora
 Torneo de Clausura (1): 2011

References

External links

1969 births
Living people
Association football midfielders
Venezuelan footballers
Venezuela international footballers
1999 Copa América players
Estudiantes de Mérida players
UA Maracaibo players
Venezuelan football managers
Zamora F.C. managers
Deportivo Táchira F.C. managers
Estudiantes de Mérida managers
FC Dallas non-playing staff
People from Mérida, Mérida
Asociación Civil Deportivo Lara managers
Mineros de Guayana managers